No. 361 Squadron was a squadron of the Royal Air Force.

History 
It was formed on 2 January 1967 at RAF Watton as a joint RAF/Royal Navy unit, to provide ECM training for the two services, initially sharing the Canberra T.17 aircraft of No. 360 Squadron RAF. Unlike its sister squadron, it was intended to operate in the Middle and Far East regions. However, following the Defence Review of early 1967 and the subsequent withdrawal from the overseas commitments, the squadron effectively ceased to exist within weeks of its formation, its crews returning to 360 Squadron. The new squadron was officially disbanded on 14 July 1967.

References

External links
Air of Authority: No 353 - 361 Squadron Histories
RAF Watton.info: The History of RAF Watton in detail for 1967
360 Squadron Association website

361 Squadron
Electronic warfare units and formations